In computing, a dynamic window manager is a tiling window manager where windows are tiled based on preset layouts between which the user can switch. Layouts typically have a main area and a secondary area. The main area usually shows one window, but one can also change the number of windows in this area. Its purpose is to reserve more space for the more important window(s). The secondary area shows the other windows.

Tiling window managers that don't use layouts are called  manual tiling window managers. They let the user decide where windows should be placed.

X Window System 

The following dynamic window managers are available for the X Window System:

 awesome
 bluetile - A full featured window manager for the GNOME environment
 dwm
 echinus
 evilwm
 fvwm
 larswm
 spectrwm
 xmonad
 Qtile

Wayland Display Server 
The following dynamic window managers are available for the Wayland Display Server:

 Qtile
 Hyprland

Notes

References 

Window managers